Magnus Bøe, also known as Kim Magnus (born 21 July 1998) is a South Korean-born Norwegian cross-country skier. He competed in the 2018 Winter Olympics.

Personal life
Magnus was born in Busan, South Korea, to a Norwegian father and South Korean mother. The family settled in Bærum, Norway, where Magnus joined the skiing club Fossum IF.

With the 2018 Winter Olympics being held in his country of birth South Korea, Magnus realized that the competition in Norway was too tough for him to gain an Olympic spot at the age of 20. He declared his allegiance for South Korea already in 2016. He competed under the South Korean surname Kim. He went to school in Norway, the Norwegian School of Elite Sport at Geilo. On 19 May 2018 he changed his nationality back to Norway. He took a cross-country skiing scholarship with the University of Colorado.

Career
His breakthrough came at the 2016 Winter Youth Olympics, where he won two gold medals in 10 kilometre freestyle and cross-country cross, and the silver medal in sprint. At the 2016 Junior World Championships he followed up with two silver medals in the 10 kilometres and the sprint.

He had made his Cross-Country Skiing World Cup in December 2015 in Lillehammer, finishing a lowly 66th. His first and only top-30 placements came in sprint events in March 2018, finishing 19th in Drammen and 27th in Falun.

In 2017 he won the sprint gold medal at the 2017 Asian Winter Games, following up with a 10 kilometre silver and a relay bronze.Official Results Book – Cross-country Skiing He competed in two events at the 2018 Junior World Championships, finishing no higher than 9th. Competing at the 2018 Olympics, he managed a 26th place in the team sprint as well as 42nd, 43rd and 47th places in the individual events.

Bøe also competed at the Biathlon Junior World Championships 2019, placing a lowly 66th.

Cross-country skiing results
All results are sourced from the International Ski Federation (FIS).

Olympic Games

World Cup

Season standings

References

External links

1998 births
Living people
Sportspeople from Bærum
Norwegian people of South Korean descent
Cross-country skiers at the 2018 Winter Olympics
South Korean male cross-country skiers
South Korean people of Norwegian descent
Olympic cross-country skiers of South Korea
Cross-country skiers at the 2017 Asian Winter Games
Asian Games medalists in cross-country skiing
Asian Games gold medalists for South Korea
Asian Games silver medalists for South Korea
Asian Games bronze medalists for South Korea
Medalists at the 2017 Asian Winter Games
Cross-country skiers at the 2016 Winter Youth Olympics
Competitors at the 2023 Winter World University Games
Medalists at the 2023 Winter World University Games
Youth Olympic gold medalists for South Korea
Norwegian expatriates in the United States
Universiade medalists in cross-country skiing
Universiade silver medalists for Norway